Petar II may refer to:

 Peter IV of Bulgaria, Bulgarian tsar, (ruled 1186–1197)
 Petar II Petrović-Njegoš, the Montenegrin ruler (1813–1851)
 Peter II of Yugoslavia, the Yugoslavian king  (ruled 1934–1945)